The Thirty Tyrants (Latin: Tyranni Triginta) were a series of thirty rulers who appear in the Historia Augusta as having ostensibly been pretenders to the throne of the Roman Empire during the reign of the emperor Gallienus.

Given the notorious unreliability of the Historia Augusta, the veracity of this list is debatable; there is a scholarly consensus that the author deliberately inflated the number of pretenders in order to parallel the Thirty Tyrants of Athens.

The Historia actually gives 32 names; however, because the author (who wrote under the name of Trebellius Pollio) places the last two during the reigns of Maximinus Thrax and Claudius II respectively, this leaves thirty alleged pretenders during the reign of Gallienus.

The following list gives the Thirty Tyrants as depicted by the Historia Augusta, along with notes contrasting the Historia Augusta's claims with their actual historical positions:

Table

Notwithstanding the author's pretensions regarding the time during which these persons aspired to the throne, this list includes:
two women and six youths who never claimed imperial dignity
seven men who either certainly or probably never claimed imperial dignity
three probably and two possibly fictitious persons
two pretenders admittedly not contemporary with Gallienus
three pretenders not contemporary with Gallienus

Leaving nine pretenders roughly contemporary with Gallienus. According to David Magie (the editor of the Loeb Classical Library edition of the Historia Augusta), at least some of these men issued coins.

See also
Crisis of the Third Century
List of Roman usurpers
Gallienus usurpers
Augustan History
Enmannsche Kaisergeschichte

References

External links
Historia Augusta: the Thirty Tyrants (Latin text and English translation)

Thirty

Thirty